The Dreamers is an album by John Zorn released in 2008 featuring performances by a band which would later become known as The Dreamers. It is viewed as continuation of the Music Romance tradition expressed on his 2001 album The Gift.

Reception
The Allmusic review by Thom Jurek awarded the album 4 stars stating "This set is not only a fitting complement to The Gift, which was fantastic in its own right, but is an actual next-step recording: it's focused, tight, humorous, and a gas to listen to from beginning to end."

Track listing
All compositions by John Zorn
 "Mow Mow" – 3:03
 "Uluwati" – 3:37
 "A Ride on Cottonfair" – 4:22 
 "Anulikwutsayl" – 9:02
 "Toys" – 2:46
 "Of Wonder and Certainty (for Lou Reed)" – 4:30 
 "Mystic Circles" – 6:08
 "Nekashim" – 3:56
 "Exodus" – 7:02
 "Forbidden Tears" – 3:07 
 "Raksasa" – 5:15
Recorded at East Side Sound, New York City in September 2007

Personnel
Cyro Baptista – percussion 
Joey Baron – drums 
Trevor Dunn – bass 
Marc Ribot – guitar 
Jamie Saft – keyboards
Kenny Wollesen – vibes  
John Zorn – alto saxophone

References

The Dreamers albums
Albums produced by John Zorn
2008 albums
Tzadik Records albums